Václav Koloušek (born 13 April 1976) is a Czech footballer who played as a midfielder.

Club career
Born in Mladá Boleslav, Koloušek began his Football career in the youth team of his hometown club FK Mladá Boleslav. From there he went to Dukla Prague. At the age of 21 he left for Italy and joined Salernitana Sport. After 2 years with Salernitana he moved on to Fermana Calcio.

In 1999, he came back home to Sparta Prague. In 2001, he moved again to Slovan Liberec, During his time at Liberec, Koloušek contracted leukemia, badly affecting his fitness. After overcoming the illness, he transferred to Slavia Prague in 2003, however due to his weakened condition he could not establish himself at Slavia.

At the start of the 2005–06 Season, the midfielder moved on to FK Marila Příbram and after a very successful Autumn in Příbram he was signed by Austrian club FC Wacker Tirol.

For the 2008–09 season he moved to Austrian 2nd Division side FC Magna Wiener Neustadt.

International career
Koloušek made his debut for the Czech Republic in a February 2002 friendly match against Hungary, in which he scored a debut goal after only five minutes. He earned 5 caps, scoring one goal. His final international game was also in 2002, a September friendly match against Yugoslavia.

International goals
Scores and results list Czech Republic's goal tally first.

References

External links
 
 
 Player profile - FC Magna
 

1976 births
Living people
Sportspeople from Mladá Boleslav
Association football midfielders
Czech footballers
Czech Republic under-21 international footballers
Czech Republic international footballers
Czech expatriate footballers
Czech First League players
FK Mladá Boleslav players
Dukla Prague footballers
AC Sparta Prague players
FC Slovan Liberec players
SK Slavia Prague players
1. FK Příbram players
FC Zbrojovka Brno players
U.S. Salernitana 1919 players
Fermana F.C. players
FC Wacker Innsbruck (2002) players
Serie A players
Serie B players
Austrian Football Bundesliga players
Expatriate footballers in Italy
Czech expatriate sportspeople in Italy
Expatriate footballers in Austria
Czech expatriate sportspeople in Austria
FC Vysočina Jihlava players